Transbrasil Flight 303 was a flight from Congonhas-São Paulo Airport in São Paulo, Brazil, to Hercílio Luz International Airport in Florianópolis, Brazil, on 12 April 1980. It crashed on approach to Hercílio Luz International Airport. Only 3 of the 58 people on board survived.

Aircraft 
The aircraft involved was a Boeing 727-27C, registration PT-TYS. It had first flown on 14 August 1966. It was delivered to Braniff Airways, which leased it to Transbrasil in 1975, and sold it to Transbrasil in 1976.

Crash 
Beginning on the morning of 12 April, the flight was scheduled to fly from Belém to Porto Alegre, with stops in Fortaleza, Brasília, Vitória, Rio de Janeiro, São Paulo, Curitiba and Florianópolis. After taking off from Belém and performing most of its stopovers, Flight 303 took off from Congonhas Airport in the early evening bound for Florianopolis, the last stopover before the final destination of the flight, Porto Alegre.

The aircraft was on a night instrument approach to Hercílio Luz International Airport in a severe thunderstorm. Around 20:38, the aircraft went off course, struck the north side of the hill Morro da Virgínia, and exploded. The heavy impact of the aircraft with the existing trees in the area caused the fuselage to be completely destroyed, throwing some of the passengers out, including a few survivors.

The crash site was difficult to reach. The rescue teams only reached the site at around 10 pm, an hour and a half after the crash. As one team rescued four survivors, another opened a clearing in the woods to allow a helicopter to land. During the night, the four survivors were removed by helicopter to hospitals in Florianópolis while the bodies of the passengers and dead crew were gathered to be transported to the Instituto Médico Legal. On the morning of 13 April, authorities had to block hundreds of people attempting to invade the crash site. Some time later, one of the survivors died, reducing the number of survivors to three.

Investigation 
The Cockpit Voice Recorder (CVR) and Flight Data Recorder (FDR) were found and recovered on 14 April. The analysis of the recorders did not indicate an abnormality in the aircraft.

Probable causes were misjudgment of speed and distance, inadequate flight supervision, failure to initiate a go-around, and improper operation of the engines.

The aircraft was piloted by an inspector from the Civil Aviation Department, who was training for the Boeing 727's supervisory role. The training was overseen by the commander of the aircraft. The bad weather caused delay in the flight and the incidence of lightning hampered the operation of the NDB of Florianópolis, generating a false block of position, which impaired the judgment of the crew. The crew's overconfidence of their geographic position  prevented the approach being done from being aborted.

The lack of modern navigational aids at the Florianopolis airport also contributed to the accident, since unlike the major airports of the time using the VOR and ILS / DME systems, Florianópolis airport used the obsolete NDB as the only aid to navigation.

Aftermath 
After the accident, the Brazilian Air Force accelerated the implementation of CINDACTA II in November 1982, while Infraero implemented, between July 1981 and April 1982, a new navigation aid system at the Hercílio Luz airport, consisting of radar, ILS/DME, and VOR while the obsolete NDB equipment was disabled.

Transbrasil was experiencing a serious financial crisis since 1975, being aggravated by the accident and by incidents, threats of strikes, layoffs, etc. In order not to fail (in mid-1987, Transbrasil had a debt of about US$120 million), the airline accepted to receive large financial contributions from the Brazilian government that came to intervene in the direction of the company between 1988 and 1989. After poor management, Transbrasil ceased operations in 2001, leaving a debt of about R$1.5 billion.

Bibliography 
 Ari César, Carlos; Silva, Germano da; O rastro da bruxa: história da aviação comercial brasileira no século XX através dos seus acidentes; Porto Alegre Editora EDIPUCRS, 2008, pp 313–317.

References

External links 
 Final report 
 

Airliner accidents and incidents involving controlled flight into terrain
Accidents and incidents involving the Boeing 727
Aviation accidents and incidents in 1980
Aviation accidents and incidents in Brazil
Transbrasil accidents and incidents
1980 in Brazil
Airliner accidents and incidents caused by weather
Airliner accidents and incidents caused by pilot error
1980 disasters in Brazil